Service contract may refer to:

 employment contract
 extended warranty
 Metropolitan Bus Service Contract
 Programmatic service contract in service-oriented architecture
 standardized service contract - software design principle
 water service contract

See also 
 contract
 service (economics)